Paolo Boffetta (born July 19, 1958) is an Italian epidemiologist. He is doing research on cancer and other chronic diseases, where he contributed to the understanding of the role of occupation, environment, alcohol, smoking and nutrition in disease development.

Biography

Boffetta was born in Turin, Italy, went to the Vittorio Alfieri High School in Turin, and studied medicine at the University of Turin and received a Doctor of Medicine degree in 1982, after which he became a resident at the Second Division of Internal Medicine and research fellow and research assistant at the Cancer Epidemiology Unit of the University of Turin.

After some years, he moved to New York City and worked as a research assistant at the Department of Statistics and Epidemiology of the American Cancer Society (1986–88). He became a research assistant at the Division of Epidemiology of the American Health Foundation in New York, in 1988 and a graduate research assistant at the Division of Environmental Sciences and Post-Doctoral Associate at the Division of Health Policy and Management of Columbia University, School of Public Health in New York (1988–89), where he was awarded a M.P.H.

In 1990, he moved to Lyon, France, to join the International Agency for Research on Cancer, IARC, first as medical officer until 1994 and later as chief of the Unit of Environmental Cancer Epidemiology (1995–2003). During this time he was also visiting scientist at the Division of Cancer Epidemiology and Genetics, US National Cancer Institute, in Washington (1998/99), foreign adjunct professor, at the Department of Medical Epidemiology and Microbiology and Tumour Biology Centre, Karolinska Institutet, Stockholm, Sweden (2000–2006).

In 2003, he moved on to the German Cancer Research Center in Heidelberg, Germany, where he headed the Division of Clinical Epidemiology. He was awarded a professorship for clinical epidemiology at the University of Heidelberg in the same year.

Only a year later Boffetta moved back to IARC, Lyon to become group head and coordinator of the Genetics and Epidemiology Cluster there.

Between 2009 and 2020, he worked at Icahn School of Medicine at Mount Sinai in New York, NY, as professor, associate director for global oncology at the Tisch Cancer Institute.  During 2010-2016, he was director of the Institute for Translational Epidemiology.

In 2020 he joined Stony Brook University, where he is professor in the Department of Department of Family, Population & Preventive Medicine and associate director for population sciences at Stony Brook Cancer Center. Since 2018, he is professor at the Department of Medical and Surgical Sciences of the University of Bologna.

He is adjunct professor at the Department of Epidemiology, Harvard School of Public Health, Boston, USA, at the Department of Medicine, Vanderbilt University, Nashville, US, at the Department of Public Health of the Catholic University in Rome, Italy, and at the Arnold School of Public Health, University of South Carolina.

He was vice president of the International Prevention Research Institute in Lyon during 2009-2013.  He regularly serves as chair or member of national and international committees, including in particular review committees of the US National Institute of Health and the National Academy of Sciences. He is a fellow of the European Academy of Cancer Sciences and the New York Academy of Medicine.

Scientific merits
Boffetta's specific field of research is the study of environmental factors for cancer. He always was very much interested in international collaboration why he was founding member and member of the executive committee of the several international research consortia, e.g. Interlymph – Non-Hodgkin's Lymphoma consortium (2001–08), the ILCCO – Lung cancer consortium (2003-), the INHANCE – Head and neck cancer consortium (2004-), the PANC4 – Pancreatic cancer consortium, the StoP Project – Stomach cancer, and the ILCEC - liver cancer consortium.
Currently Boffetta is involved in several case-control studies of molecular epidemiology in different organs and countries around the world. Paolo Boffetta is a Member of the Steering Committee of the Asia Cohort Consortium (ACC) and was Chair of the Molecular Epidemiology Group (MEG) of the American Association for Cancer Research (AACR) (2008–2009).

He has been heavily involved in teaching activities during all his academic and research positions; e.g., at IARC he held the post of Director, IARC Course Programme (2000–2003 and 2004–2009). He was also Director of the IARC Fellowship Programme (2004–2009) and a Member of the UICC Fellowship Committee (2000–2009).  He is currently teaching advanced epidemiology methods and cancer epidemiology at the Icahn School of Medicine at Mount Sinai, University of Bologna, and Harvard School of Public Health.

Currently he is a Member of the editorial board of several scientific journals including Annals of Oncology (Associate Editor), Cancer Discovery, Frontiers in Molecular Epidemiology (Editor), International Archives of Occupational and Environmental Health, International Journal of Molecular Epidemiology and Genetics, Journal of the American College of Cardiology (Section Editor). He was the Editor in Chief of the 3rd Edition of Elsevier's Encyclopaedia of Cancer.

Paolo Boffetta has published more than 1,300 scientific articles and 80 book chapters as well as is editor of 15 books and journal supplements, and has authored several other non-English and non-scientific articles about various aspects of health.  His H-index is 118 (Web of Science) and 173 (Google Scholar). He is listed among the top 20 Italian scientists.

References

External links
 InterLymph homepage
 ILCCO homepage
 INHANCE homepage
 PANC4 homepage
 EPIC homepage
 ACC homepage
 AACR homepage
 UICC homepage

1958 births
Living people
Cancer epidemiologists
Columbia University Mailman School of Public Health alumni
Heidelberg University alumni
University of Turin alumni
Vanderbilt University alumni
University of Ottawa alumni
Harvard School of Public Health faculty
Physicians from Turin
Academic staff of the University of Bologna
Italian expatriates in Germany